The men's sabre was one of seven fencing events on the fencing at the 1956 Summer Olympics programme. It was the thirteenth appearance of the event. The competition was held on 5 December 1956. 35 fencers from 17 nations competed. Nations had been limited to three fencers each since 1928. The event was won by Rudolf Kárpáti, the seventh of nine straight Games in which a Hungarian would win the event. Jerzy Pawłowski of Poland took silver and Lev Kuznetsov of the Soviet Union took bronze, the first medals in the event for each nation and the first time since 1924 that any nation other than Hungary and Italy earned a medal in the men's sabre.

Background

This was the 13th appearance of the event, which is the only fencing event to have been held at every Summer Olympics. Four of the nine finalists from 1952 returned: gold medalist (and 1948 bronze medalist) Pál Kovács of Hungary, silver medalist (and 1948 gold and 1936 bronze medalist) Aladár Gerevich of Hungary, fourth-place finisher Gastone Darè of Italy, and sixth-place finisher Jacques Lefèvre of France. The last three world champions were on the heavily favored Hungarian team: 1953 champion Kovács (who had also won in 1937), 1954 champion Rudolf Kárpáti, and 1955 champion Gerevich (also in 1935 and 1951).

Colombia, Indonesia, and Luxembourg each made their debut in the men's sabre; East and West Germany competed together as the United Team of Germany. Italy made its 11th appearance in the event, most of any nation (surpassing Denmark, which missed the men's sabre event for the first time since competing in 1908), having missed the inaugural 1896 event and the 1904 St. Louis Games.

Competition format

The competition used a pool play format, with each fencer facing the other fencers in the pool in a round robin. Bouts were to 5 touches. Barrages were used to break ties necessary for advancement (touches against were the first tie-breaker used to give ranks when the rank did not matter). However, only as much fencing was done as was necessary to determine advancement, so some bouts never occurred if the fencers advancing from the pool could be determined. The 12 fencers from the top four teams in the team sabre event received a bye in the first round.

 Round 1: There 4 pools of between 5 and 6 fencers each. The top 4 fencers in each pool advanced to the quarterfinals.
 Quarterfinals: There were 4 pools of 7 fencers each. The top 4 fencers in each quarterfinal advanced to the semifinals.
 Semifinals: There were 2 pools of 8 fencers each. The top 4 fencers in each semifinal advanced to the final.
 Final: The final pool had 8 fencers.

Schedule

All times are Australian Eastern Standard Time (UTC+10)

Results

Round 1

The top 4 fencers in each pool advanced to the quarterfinals. Fencers from the four teams that advanced to the final of the men's team sabre event received byes through round 1:
 France: Claude Gamot, Jacques Lefèvre, and Jacques Roulot
 Hungary: Aladár Gerevich, Rudolf Kárpáti, and Pál Kovács
 Poland: Marian Kuszewski, Jerzy Pawłowski, and Wojciech Zabłocki
 Soviet Union: Yevhen Cherepovsky, Lev Kuznetsov, and Yakov Rylsky

Pool 1

 Barrage

Pool 2

Pool 3

 Barrage

Pool 4

 Barrage

Quarterfinals

The top 4 fencers in each pool advanced to the semifinals.

Quarterfinal 1

Quarterfinal 2

 Barrage

Quarterfinal 3

Quarterfinal 4

 Barrage

Semifinals

The top 4 fencers in each pool advanced to the final.

Semifinal 1

Semifinal 2

Final

 Barrage

References

Sabre men
Men's events at the 1956 Summer Olympics